Osh International Airport  is an airport serving Osh, the capital of Osh Region (oblast) of Kyrgyzstan.

In 2016, 1,210,576 passengers passed through the airport, an increase of 33% over the previous years.

Airlines and destinations

Ground transportation 

Marshrutka routes No. 107 and 142 serve the airport.

Accidents and incidents
On 28 December 2011, Kyrgyzstan Tupolev TU-134A, registration EX-020, operating flight QH3 from Bishkek to Osh, Kyrgyzstan, with 73 passengers and 6 crew suffered a hard landing on Osh's runway 12 resulting in the collapse of the right main gear, right wing separation and the aircraft rolling on its back in fog and low visibility. The aircraft came to a stop on soft ground about 10 meters off the right runway edge. A fuel leak from the left wing led to a fire erupting which was quickly extinguished by airport emergency services. One passenger received serious injuries and 24 people received minor injuries (concussions, bruises), of which 16 were taken to local hospitals. 
On 22 November 2015, a Boeing 737-300 registration EX-37005, operating as Avia Traffic Company Flight 768, touched down hard at Osh Airport, injuring 8, and causing all the landing gear to be ripped off. The aircraft skidded off the runway and the left engine was ripped off.

See also
List of the busiest airports in the former USSR
Transportation in Kyrgyzstan

References

External links 

 Osh Airport
 
 

Airports in Kyrgyzstan
Airports built in the Soviet Union
Osh